Manuel Sergio del Corazón de Jesús Aguilera Gómez (27 July 1936 – 8 October 2022) was a Mexican politician. A member of the Institutional Revolutionary Party, he served in the Senate of the Republic from 1991 to 1993.

Aguilera died in Mexico City on 8 October 2022, at the age of 86.

References

1936 births
2022 deaths
20th-century Mexican politicians
Institutional Revolutionary Party politicians
Members of the Senate of the Republic (Mexico)
National Autonomous University of Mexico alumni
Politicians from Mexico City